Alan Nicoll Guild (born 27 March 1947) is a Scottish footballer, who played for East Fife, Luton Town and Cambridge United. He later played minor counties cricket for Cambridgeshire in the summer of 1983, making two appearances.

References

External links

1947 births
Living people
People from Forfar
Scottish footballers
Association football central defenders
Scottish Football League players
English Football League players
Forfar West End F.C. players
East Fife F.C. players
Luton Town F.C. players
Cambridge United F.C. players
Cambridge City F.C. players
Scottish cricketers
Cambridgeshire cricketers
Footballers from Angus, Scotland
Scottish Junior Football Association players